Portmore is a large urban settlement located along the southeastern coast of Jamaica in Saint Catherine, and a dormitory community for the neighbouring cities of Kingston and Spanish Town.

Geography
Portmore is on the south coast in the Parish of St. Catherine. It is approximately 15 miles south-west of the capital of Kingston. It is divided into two regions, the plains to the north and the limestone hills of Hellshire to the south.

The most densely populated areas are located on low-lying reclaimed lands.  Portmore consists of communities such as Old Portmore, Greater Portmore, Braeton and Hellshire. Portmore is one of the largest urban areas in St. Catherine with respect to human settlement, having a population 156,468(2001 census) and an annual growth rate of 4% since 1991.

Portmore is built on a generally flat plain facing the Kingston Harbour with an intricate canal system which prevents flooding. Much of the land is reclaimed swamp. Port Henderson Hill, formerly known as Salt Pond Hill, is visible from neighbouring parishes and was a possible Arawak grave site because the Arawak buried their dead in caverns, which Port Henderson Hill is riddled with. The most famous cave is named "Twin Sisters".

History
Portmore began as a large area for schematic residential development in the late 1960s, as the West Indies Home Contractors (WIHCON) organization built thousands of prototype housing units in an effort to alleviate the over-population of Kingston; the first was called Independence City. It has since grown into a suburban city to Kingston; its large population travels into Kingston daily for work, schooling, and many other essential services via the Portmore toll road.

Portmore was granted Municipality status in 2003 and has its own city council and mayor, following the British-based model of Jamaican local government. It now houses approximately 10% of the population of the Kingston Corporate Area.

Currently the mayor of Portmore is His Worship the Mayor Leon Thomas.

Portmore has affiliations with music artists Vybz Kartel, Mad Cobra, I-Wayne, Masicka, Gyptian, Spice and many soundsystems such as "Flavor Unit" and "Areacode 876".

Economy
While Portmore is not marketed as a tourist destination for the millions of incoming travelers to Jamaica every year, there are many places for entertainment, eating, relaxing and enjoyment such as beaches, restaurants, hotels and much more.

Transportation

Portmore is served by the Jamaica Urban Transit Company Limited (JUTC) which provides bus transportation for Portmore residents both locally and into Kingston and Spanish Town.

The city is served by the Norman Manley International Airport with over 130 flights weekly.

Sport
Portmore has a professional football team that plays in the top flight Jamaica National Premier League. It was originally Hazard United from May Pen but following its relocation is now called Portmore United F.C.

Horse Racing is popular and all major horse races are run at Caymanas Park located in north Portmore.

Notable people
 

 Popcaan (born 1988), dancehall singer and songwriter
 Floyd West (born 1980), contemporary Reggae roots singer and songwriter

References

External links

 Aerial view
 Portmore Jamaica information.
 Portmore Municipality homepage.
 All about the Municipality of Portmore.
 Portmore's Virtual Communications Hub (www.portmore.com).

Populated places established in the 1960s
Populated coastal places in Jamaica
Kingston